The Valley is a 27,111 capacity sports stadium in Charlton, London, England and has been the home of Charlton Athletic Football Club since the 1920s, with a period of exile between 1985 and 1992. It is served by Charlton railway station, which is less than a five-minute walk away from the stadium. An alternative route is the Jubilee line; exiting at North Greenwich, and changing for route 161, 472 and 486 buses, which stop outside the stadium.

History
In Charlton's early years, the club had a nomadic existence using several different grounds between its formation in 1905 and the beginning of World War I in 1914. The ground dates from 1919, at a time when Charlton were moderately successful and looking for a new home. The club found an abandoned sand and chalk pit in Charlton, but did not have sufficient funds to fully develop the site. An army of volunteer Charlton supporters dug out a flat area for the pitch at the bottom of the chalk pit and used the excavated material to build up makeshift stands. The ground's name most likely comes from its original valley-like appearance. The club played its first game at the ground before any seats, or even terraces, were installed; there was simply a roped-off pitch with the crowd standing or sitting on the adjoining earthworks. The unique circumstances of the ground's initial construction led to an unusually intense bond between the club's supporters and the site that exists to this day. In the 1923–24 season, Charlton played at The Mount stadium in Catford but in a much more highly populated area. A proposed merger with Catford South End FC fell through and thus Charlton moved back to the Valley.

In 1967, Len Silver the promoter at Hackney made an application to open Charlton as a British League speedway club, and plans were put forward to construct a track around the perimeter of the football pitch. The application to include speedway at the Valley was enthusiastically supported initially, but was eventually ruled out on the grounds of noise nuisance.

For many years, the Valley was one of the largest Football League grounds in Britain, although its highest maximum capacity of 75,000 was only half the capacity of Glasgow's Hampden Park. However, Charlton's long absence from the top level of English football prevented much-needed renovation, as funds dried up and attendances fell. Charlton were relegated from the First Division in 1957 and did not return until 1986, and in 1972 were relegated to the Third Division for the first time in the postwar era.

Eventually, the club's debts led to it almost going out of business in the early 1980s. A consortium of supporters successfully acquired the club in 1984, but the Valley remained under the ownership of the club's former owner. However, the club was unable to finance the improvements needed to make the Valley meet new safety requirements. Shortly after the start of the 1985–86 season, Charlton left the Valley, entering into an agreement with Crystal Palace to share the latter's Selhurst Park facilities, the first official groundsharing arrangement in the Football League in 36 years.

In 1988, the ownership of the club and the Valley was again united, and in a "grass roots" effort that harkened back to the ground's initial construction, thousands of supporters volunteered to clean the ground, eventually burning the debris in a huge bonfire on the pitch. By this time, however, the large terraces were no longer seen as desirable or safe. Charlton Athletic supporters then proposed to completely rebuild the stadium in order for Charlton to return there at the beginning of the 1990s. However, the Greenwich Borough Council overwhelmingly turned down plans to renovate the ground. Club supporters formed their own local political party, the Valley Party, in response to the council's decision. The party ran candidates for all but two Greenwich Council seats, sparing the two councillors who had approved the new stadium plans. The party won almost 15,000 votes in the 1990 local elections, successfully pressuring the council to approve the plans for the new stadium.

In 1991, construction began on the new Valley, and the club moved from Selhurst Park to West Ham's Upton Park. It was originally hoped that the club would return to the stadium before Christmas that year, but the re-opening of the stadium faced a series of delays before finally opening in December 1992. Since then, the ground itself has undergone some remarkable changes. The north, east and west sides of the ground have almost been completely rebuilt, giving the ground a capacity of over 27,000 by December 2001, when Charlton were in the second season of a stay in the FA Premier League which would last for seven seasons. The club have ambitions to extend the ground's capacity to over 40,000 by expanding the east side and completely rebuilding the south side, but it remains uncertain if or when the plans will be implemented after the club's relegation from the Premier League in 2007 and from the Championship two years later.

In 2004 the Unity Cup was held at the Valley with Nigeria winning the competition.

On September 24th 2022, the Valley held a charity match hosted by the YouTube group Sidemen against other major YouTube personalities who formed the YouTube All-Stars, most notably Darren Watkins, also known as IShowSpeed,  with Mark Clattenburg as the match referee. The game ended 8-7 for the Sidemen and it raised over £1,000,000 split between the Teenage Cancer Trust, CALM, Rays of Sunshine and M7 Education charities.

Stands

The Covered End
Capacity: 9,000

The North Stand was built as a replacement for the 'covered end', and is still called by this name. It was built during the 2001–02 season as part of the developments to bring the Valley's capacity to 26,500 after promotion to the Premier League in 2000. The North Stand houses the most vocal supporters in the ground in particular the upper tier alongside a drum, along with restaurants and executive suites.

Alan Curbishley Stand
Capacity: 5,802

The East Stand was constructed during the 1993–94 season and fully completed in 1994. As part of the first development to the ground since the return in 1992, it replaced the massive east terrace, which had remained closed and prohibited from use since the mid-1980s after the Bradford City stadium fire. The East Stand consists of a single tier of seats and houses the television gantry, and also has numerous executive boxes. Occasionally, for FA and League Cup matches, part of the East Stand is used to house away supporters if the demand for away team tickets is high. On 9 April 2021, the club announced that from the start of 2021/22 season, the stand would be renamed to the Alan Curbishley Stand in honour of the former player and manager and to celebrate the 30th anniversary of when Curbishley was appointed manager of the club - a role he held from 1991 to 2006.

West Stand
Capacity: 9,000

The West Stand was built in 1998 after Charlton's first promotion to the Premier League and is also two tiered. This is the main stand at the Valley with the largest capacity, and also houses the club's offices, as well as the director's box, board room dug-outs, changing rooms and the commercial centre (ticket office). There are also many conferencing rooms in this stand which are used for official and community events. There is a large statue of Sam Bartram, (considered to be Charlton's finest player) at the entrance of the West Stand.

Jimmy Seed Stand
Capacity: 3,000

The Jimmy Seed (or South) Stand is the oldest part of the ground, and dates from the early 1980s. This stand is named after Charlton's manager, Jimmy Seed (1895–1966) – with whom Charlton won the FA Cup in 1947. This stand has a capacity of around 3,000 and hosts the away supporters at games. It is also the only part of the Valley with a supporting pillar.

Details

Records
 Record attendance: 75,031 v. Aston Villa, 12 February 1938 (FA Cup Fifth Round)
 Record league attendance: 68,160 v. Arsenal, 17 October 1936 (Football League First Division) - (Arsenal won, 2-0, and Denis Compton scored one goal)
 Record all-seater attendance: 27,111 v Chelsea, 17 September 2005; v. Tottenham Hotspur, 1 October 2005; v. Liverpool, 16 December 2006; v. Chelsea, 3 February 2007; v West Ham United, 24 February 2007; v. Sheffield United, 21 April 2007 (all Premier League)

Average attendances
The Valley's highest average attendance came in the 1948–49 season when crowds averaged 40,216, making Charlton one of only thirteen clubs in English football to achieve a seasonal average of 40,000+. The Valley's lowest average attendance is 5,108 from the 1984–85 season.

Highest

Lowest

Average attendance for every season since 1993–94, the first full season since Charlton returned to the Valley.

*Last 5 home matches played behind close doors due to the COVID-19 pandemic.

**Due to the COVID-19 pandemic all home matches were played behind closed doors except for two matches which had limited crowds.

References

External links

Aerial shot of the Valley
Stadium Plan www.cafc.co.uk

Charlton Athletic F.C.
Football venues in London
Sports venues in London
Defunct rugby league venues in England
London Broncos
Premier League venues
Charlton, London
Sports venues completed in 1919
English Football League venues